Donka Angatscheva (born 1 January 1979, Plovdiv, Bulgaria) is an Austrian pianist of Bulgarian descent. She lives in Vienna.

Early life 
At age 5 Angatscheva received her first piano lessons. Her first public appearance came at age 10 with the Plovdiv Philharmonic Orchestra. She started her studies at the Vienna University of Music and Performing Arts (MDW) in the class of Heinz Medjimorec where she earned a master of arts in piano performance in 2004.

At the Queen Elizabeth College of Music (la Chapelle Musicale reine Elisabeth- CMRE) she completed her postgraduate studies in the class of the Artemis Quartet and with Avedis Kouyoumdjian.,

Career 
Angatscheva played in 2011 together with her trio D´Ante at the Radio France Festival Montpellier, at the Chopin Festival Flagey, Palais des Beaux-Arts in Brussels and at the Festival Menton, France.

In December 2012 she gave a guest performance with D´Ante at the Tonhalle Zürich.

In June 2013 she played the Malediction by Franz Liszt at the Liszt Festival Raiding with the Bayreuther Chamber Orchestra conducted by Nicolaus Richter. A follow up performance with D´Ante came In 2014.

Personal life 
Angatscheva is fluent in German, Bulgarian, English, Spanish, Greek and Serbo-Croatian. She is married and has two daughters.

Awards 
 1989: First prize at the national piano contest „Dimitar Nenov“, Razgrad, Bulgaria.
 1990: Second prize (first prize was not awarded) at the 8th International piano contest in Salerno, Italy.
 1997: second prize (first prize was not awarded) at the national piano contest at the Academy of Music and Arts, Plovdiv, Bulgaria.
 2003: First prize at the 13th International Chamber Music Contest in Thessaloniki, Greece together with Daniela Ivanova, violist with the Wiener Philharmoniker.  
 2007: First prize at the 17th International Chamber Music Contest in Thessaloniki, Greece with her trio D´Ante.
 2011: Winner of the „Young Artist Award“ by Foundation Aeschlimann, Switzerland

Discography 
 2001: Frédéric Chopin, pianoworks (Global Private Equity).
 2010: Cuatro estaciones porteñas-Astor Piazzolla, E.Fernandes Arbos.

Trio D’Ante - Donka Angatscheva-piano, Valya Dervenska - violin, Teodora Miteva-cello 
 2011: piano trios Chopin, Liszt, Rachmaninoff, Schostakowitsch. Trio D'Ante-Vienna
Donka Angatscheva -pia o
Valya Dervenska-violin
Teodora Miteva-cello
(Gramola 98934).
 2011: Franz Liszt, pianoworks (Gramola 98924)
 2014: Mozart, Sarasate

Yury Revich-violin Donka Angatscheva-piano (Onepoint.fm) 
 2015: Addinsell, Rota, Piazzolla

Vogtland Philharmonie, Stefan Fraas-Dirigent, Donka Angatscheva-piano 
 2016: "Appassionato"- Ludwig van Beethoven, pianoworks
 2017: "Dedication"-pianoworks, Franz Liszt

References

External links 
 Donka Angatscheva - Jury at Austrian Piano Open • International Music Competition, 2017
 Donka Angatscheva Official Website
 Liszt Festival Raiding: Stage Talk
 Fantastic Addinsell, Rota and Piazzolla from Donka Angatschewa
 Ein Farbenkünstler
 Donka Angatschewa: Es lassen sich in jedem Werk immer wieder neue Facetten entlocken
 Angatscheva, Donka: Liszt-Recital

Austrian classical pianists
Austrian women pianists
1979 births
Living people
21st-century classical pianists
Women classical pianists
21st-century Austrian musicians
Musicians from Plovdiv
Bulgarian emigrants to Austria
20th-century classical pianists
University of Music and Performing Arts Vienna alumni
20th-century women pianists
21st-century women pianists